"Operator" is a Motown song recorded by Motown vocalists Mary Wells and Brenda Holloway. The Wells version was the b-side to her top ten hit, "Two Lovers" while Holloway's was issued as a single in 1965.

Overview

Song information
In the song, written by Smokey Robinson of The Miracles, the narrator talks of wanting the phone operator to reach her boyfriend, who is supposedly on the other end of the line, but much to her chagrin, the operator is having problems reaching the other line, which reports static and throughout the difficulties, the narrator begs the operator to "put him on the line".

Charts

Brenda Holloway version
Brenda Holloway's version of the song, which is produced under a more soulful rendition than Wells' teen pop-styled version from three years before, reached number 78 on the Billboard Hot 100 and number 36 on the R&B singles chart.

Credits

Mary Wells version
Lead vocal by Mary Wells
Background vocals by The Love Tones
Instrumentation by The Funk Brothers

Brenda Holloway version
Lead vocal by Brenda Holloway
Background vocals by The Andantes
Instrumentation by The Funk Brothers

References

1963 singles
1965 singles
Mary Wells songs
Brenda Holloway songs
Songs written by Smokey Robinson
Songs about telephone calls
Motown singles
Song recordings produced by Smokey Robinson
1963 songs